Grange of Mallusk (from Irish: Maigh Bhloisce, meaning 'Bloisce's plain), or Mallusk, is a village and townland (of 933 acres) in County Antrim, Northern Ireland. Mallusk is within the urban area of Newtownabbey, and it is also within the Antrim and Newtownabbey Borough Council area. It is situated in the civil parish of Templepatrick and the historic barony of Belfast Lower.

Local Churches 

 Hydepark Presbyterian Church
 The People's Church Newtownabbey

Education 

 Mallusk Integrated Primary School
 Mallusk Community Playgroup

Places of interest 

 Mallusk Village Hall
 Mallusk Cemetery
 City of Belfast Playing Fields

Transport 
Despite being outside of Belfast, Mallusk is served by the 1e Translink Metro buses. They run from Roughfort to Belfast City Centre via Antrim Road and Carlisle Circus.

References

Villages in County Antrim
Newtownabbey